The 1993 NFL season was the 74th regular season of the National Football League (NFL). After the success of expanding the regular season to a period of 17 weeks in 1990, the league hoped this new schedule would generate even more revenue. This was also done to avoid scheduling playoff games on January 1 and competing with college football bowl games. The NFL's teams, however, felt that having two weeks off during the regular season was too disruptive for their weekly routines, and thus the regular season reverted to 17 weeks immediately after the season ended. 2021 marked the first season where an 18-week schedule would include 17 regular-season games.

On March 1, 1993, the current free agent system was introduced to the league.

The season ended with Super Bowl XXVIII when the Dallas Cowboys defeated the Buffalo Bills 30–13 for the second consecutive season at the Georgia Dome. This remains the only time both Super Bowl participants have been the same in successive seasons. The Cowboys became the first team to win a Super Bowl after losing their first two regular season games. This game also marked the fourth consecutive Super Bowl loss by the Bills, who remain the only team to reach four straight Super Bowls.

Player movement

Transactions
On April 6, 1993, Reggie White was signed by the Green Bay Packers and agreed to terms on a four-year contract worth $17 million.
June 9: The Kansas City Chiefs signed Los Angeles Raiders running back Marcus Allen.

Trades
March 17, 1993: The Cincinnati Bengals traded Boomer Esiason to the New York Jets.
April 20, 1993: Joe Montana was traded to the Kansas City Chiefs and signed a $10 million contract over three years.
August 17: The Chicago Bears trade John Roper and Markus Paul to the Dallas Cowboys
August 20: The Minnesota Vikings trade quarterback Rich Gannon to Washington.
August 24: The Denver Broncos trade wide receiver Vance Johnson to the Minnesota Vikings 
August 26: The Phoenix Cardinals traded wide receiver Ernie Jones to the Los Angeles Rams.
August 30: The Atlanta Falcons traded punter Tim Kalal to the Green Bay Packers.
August 30: The Kansas City Chiefs trade running back Barry Word to the Minnesota Vikings.
August 30: The Kansas City Chiefs trade guard Rich Baldinger to the New England Patriots.
October 5: The Los Angeles Rams trade tight end Jim Price to the Dallas Cowboys.
October 12: The Atlanta Falcons trade running back Eric Dickerson and cornerback Bruce Pickens to the Green Bay Packers.
October 13: The Los Angeles Raiders trade special teams player Elvis Patterson to the Dallas Cowboys, along with a seventh round pick (#216-Toddrick McIntosh), in exchange for a fifth round (#159-Roosevelt Patterson) and a seventh round draft choice (#217-Rob Holmberg).
October 19: The Pittsburgh Steelers traded running back Tim Worley to the Chicago Bears.

Draft

The 1993 NFL Draft was held from April 25 to 26, 1993 at New York City's Marriott Marquis. With the first pick, the New England Patriots selected quarterback Drew Bledsoe from Washington State University.

New referee
Ron Blum, a line judge from 1985 to 92, was promoted to referee to replace Pat Haggerty, who retired after the 1992 season. In 28 seasons in the NFL, Haggerty was selected as the referee Super Bowl XIII in 1979, XVI in 1982, and XIX in 1985.

Major rule changes
 The Play Clock (the time limit the offensive team has to snap the ball between plays) was reduced from 45 seconds to 40 seconds (the time interval after time outs and other administrative stoppages remained 25 seconds).
 Ineligible receiver down field prior to a forward pass foul was added.
 The passer could now legally throw a pass away, without any offensive player having a chance to catch the ball, as long as they are out of the pocket and the ball lands beyond the line of scrimmage.
 The player taking a snap from the center, upon receiving the ball, can immediately throw the football directly into the ground (i.e. spike) to stop the game clock.
 The NFL added an extra (second) bye week into the season for each team.  The extra bye week was removed in 1994.

Preseason

American Bowl
A series of NFL pre-season exhibition games were held at four varying sites outside the United States, with three in Europe and one in Japan.

Regular season

Scheduling formula

Highlights of the 1993 season included:
Thanksgiving: Two games were played on Thursday, November 25, featuring Chicago at Detroit and Miami at Dallas, with Chicago and Miami winning.

Final standings

Tiebreakers
Buffalo was the top AFC playoff seed based on head-to-head victory over Houston (1–0).
Denver was the second AFC Wild Card ahead of Pittsburgh and Miami, based on better conference record (8–4 to Steelers’ 7–5 to Dolphins’ 6–6).
Pittsburgh was the third AFC Wild Card based on head-to-head victory over Miami (1–0).
San Francisco was the second NFC playoff seed based on head-to-head victory over Detroit (1–0).
Minnesota finished ahead of Green Bay in the NFC Central based on head-to-head sweep (2–0).

Playoffs

Awards

Coaching changes

 Chicago Bears: Dave Wannstedt replaced the fired Mike Ditka.
 Denver Broncos: Wade Phillips replaced the fired Dan Reeves.
 New England Patriots: Bill Parcells replaced the fired Dick MacPherson.
 New York Giants: Dan Reeves replaced the fired Ray Handley.
 Washington Redskins: Richie Petitbon became head coach after Joe Gibbs retired.

Uniform changes
 The New England Patriots introduced new uniforms, changing their primary color from red to royal blue, and their white helmets and pants to silver. They also replaced the "Pat Patriot" helmet logo with the later-coined "Flying Elvis", a gray face of a minuteman that fans felt resembled the profile of a young Elvis Presley.

Television
This was the fourth and final year under the league's broadcast contracts with ABC, CBS, NBC, TNT, and ESPN. ABC, CBS, and NBC continued to televise Monday Night Football, the NFC package, the AFC package, respectively. Sunday night games aired on TNT during the first half of the season, and ESPN during the second half of the season. When new four-year contracts were signed in December 1993, CBS lost their rights to broadcasting NFC games to the then-seven-year old Fox Network, which had just started its own sports division. This ended a 37-year association with the NFL for CBS.

Jim Lampley became the new host of NBC's NFL Live!, replacing Bob Costas who would still contribute in a limited role. Mike Ditka also joined NFL Live! as an analyst, while O. J. Simpson became a regular on-site reporter. This would be Simpson's last season as an NFL broadcaster before being charged with murder in Summer 1994.

External links
Football Outsiders 1993 DVOA Ratings and Commentary

References

 NFL Record and Fact Book
 NFL History 1991–2000  (Last accessed December 4, 2005)
 Total Football: The Official Encyclopedia of the National Football League
 1993 NFL season at Pro Football Reference

National Football League seasons
 
National Football League